Incanto is the twelfth studio album by Classical Italian tenor Andrea Bocelli, released on 4 November 2008 and coinciding with his 50th birthday. The album, a personal tribute to the musical traditions of his homeland, features mainly Neapolitan love songs from Bocelli's childhood.

The two disc set also contains Incanto: The Documentary, a bonus DVD containing exclusive documentary footage, including an interview with Bocelli filmed in Naples, alongside a music video showcasing the Italian city in the 1950s. The video features rare clips of notable figures enjoying the romance of Naples in its heyday such as Elizabeth Taylor, Richard Burton, Sophia Loren, John F. Kennedy, among others.

On 21 February 2009, on the Italian talk-show, Che tempo che fa, Bocelli received a four times Diamond disc for Incanto, for selling in excess of 1.5 million copies within 4 months of its release.  The album was also nominated for "album of the year" at the 2009 Classical BRIT Awards.

Track listing
 "Un Amore Cosi Grande" (feat. Veronica Berti) (Guido Maria Ferilli, Antonella Maggio) - 4:22
 "'O Surdato 'Nnammurato" (Aniello Califano, Enrico Cannio) - 2:49
 "Mamma" (Cesare Andrea Bixio, Bixio Cherubini) - 3:30
 "Voglio Vivere Cosi" (Giovanni D’Anzi, Domenico Titomaglio) - 3:02
 "Santa Lucia" (traditional, Teodoro Cottrau) - 4:27
 "Funiculì, Funiculà" (Luigi Denza, Peppino Turco) - 2:31
 "Because" (Guy d'Hardelot, Edward Frederick Lockton) - 2:36
 "Vieni Sul Mar!" (Aniello Califano) - 4:37
 "Granada" (Agustín Lara) - 4:12
 "Era De Maggio" (feat. Anna Bonitatibus) (Mario Costa, Salvatore di Giacomo) - 4:57
 "A Marechiare" (Francesco Paolo Tosti, Salvatore di Giacomo) - 3:14
 "... E Vui Durmiti Ancora" (Gaetano E. Calì, Giovanni Formisano) - 5:03
 "Non Ti Scordar di Me" (Ernesto De Curtis, Domenico Furno) - 3:59
 "Pulcinella" (Antonello Cascone, arr., Sergio Cirillo) - 2:46

 Japan bonus tracks
  "Torna a Surriento" (Ernesto De Curtis)
 "Tu che m'hai preso il cuor" from The Land of Smiles (Franz Lehár)

Reviews
Blogcritics gave the album a favorable review.

Charts

Weekly charts

Year-end charts

Certifications and sales

References

External links
 Incanto charts

Andrea Bocelli albums
Andrea Bocelli video albums
Decca Records albums
2008 albums